Wamrong is a hill town in Trashigang District in eastern Bhutan. It is located along the highway between Trashigang and Samdrup Jongkhar. The post code of Wamrong town is 42004.

References

External links
Satellite map at Maplandia.com

Populated places in Bhutan